Marietta Marich (née Cox; April 5, 1930 – September 28, 2017) was an American actress, singer, writer, stage director, and television host. Born in Dallas, Texas, Marich became a prominent stage actress in Houston beginning in the 1950s. She later began appearing in films in the 1980s, making her screen debut in Courtship (1987). She subsequently appeared in a number of films in supporting roles, including Simple Men (1992), Leap of Faith (1993), and Wes Anderson's Rushmore (1998).

Marich garnered renewed attention for her portrayal of Luda Mae Hewitt, mother of Leatherface, in the 2003 remake of The Texas Chainsaw Massacre, as well as its prequel, The Texas Chainsaw Massacre: The Beginning (2006). Her final film appearance was in House of Good and Evil (2013), before her death in 2017 of aortic dissection, aged 87.

Biography
Marich was born Marietta Cox in Dallas, Texas on April 5, 1930. Both her parents were performers, and she began appearing in theatrical productions with them at USO events in her childhood. She also sang in the Tommy Dorsey Orchestra.

In the 1950s, Marich became a well-known figure in Houston, where she hosted her own local television show, called Midnight With Marietta, and operated several live theaters in Houston of which she was principal director. She originated the role of Miss Mona in the first Houston version of The Best Little Whorehouse in Texas in 1979, but was subsequently fired from the production due to professional clashes with the theater company. Marich responded that she had been fired "because I am a perfectionist, and I made demands for perfection."

Marich made her feature film debut in the 1987 film Courtship. She went on to appear in supporting roles in a number of films throughout the late 1980s and 1990s, including Simple Men (1992), Leap of Faith (1993), Children of the Corn IV: The Gathering (1996), Two Mothers for Zachary (1998), and Wes Anderson's cult film Rushmore (also 1998).

In her later years, she became known for her roles in horror films, including the 2003 remake of The Texas Chainsaw Massacre, starring Jessica Biel. Marich reprised her role as Luda Mae Hewitt in the 2006 prequel, The Texas Chainsaw Massacre: The Beginning. In 2013, she replaced fellow veteran actress Tippi Hedren in House of Good and Evil.

Personal life
Marich was married to former radio host Bob Marich who predeceased her in 2012. They had a son, actor Michael Marich, and a daughter, Allison, who portrayed a younger version of Marietta's character in The Texas Chainsaw Massacre: The Beginning.

Death
Marich died on September 28, 2017, in Memorial Hermann Hospital in Houston, Texas, following complications from an aortic dissection. Her memorial service took place at the Grace Presbyterian Church in Houston, Texas, where she was a member.

Filmography

Select stage credits

References

External links

 
 

1930 births
2017 deaths
20th-century American actresses
21st-century American actresses
Actresses from Dallas
Actresses from Houston
American film actresses
American television actresses
American stage actresses
American women singers
American Presbyterians
Deaths from aortic dissection